Connetquot High School (CHS) is a public high school serving students from the communities of Bohemia, Oakdale and Ronkonkoma, and parts of Sayville and West Sayville, in the 9th-12th grades, located in Bohemia, New York. It is part of the Connetquot Central School District.

History
The school was established in 1963, three years after voters in the existing Oakdale-Bohemia and Ronkonkoma school districts voted to consolidate their two districts.

Academics
According to Newsday data, 91.2% of Connetquot graduates earn a New York state regent's diploma (55.2% with advanced designation).  Also, 55.6% of graduates plan to attend a 4-year college and 35.8% plan to attend a 2-year college.

Athletics
The school competes in Section XI of the New York State Public High School Athletic Association.

Notable alumni
John Bolaris- television meteorologist and real estate agent
Sal Butera – MLB catcher
Michael Carbonaro – magician, television personality
Thomas Croci –  former New York State Senator
Stefanie DeLeo – author, playwright
Moira Kelly – actress
Jane Monheit – jazz and adult contemporary vocalist
John Pacella – MLB pitcher drafted by New York Mets in 1974
Timothy Treadwell – documentary filmmaker
Alexis Weik – New York State Senator

References

External links
High School website

Public high schools in New York (state)
Schools in Suffolk County, New York